Flubber is the second album by Chicago-based alternative country band Souled American. It was released in 1989 by Rough Trade Records, and re-released, as part of the Framed box set, by tUMULt Records in 1999.

Track listing
 "All Good Things" (Adducci) – (4:41)
 "Mar'boro Man" (Adducci/Grigoroff) – (2:56)
 "Wind to Dry" (Adducci) – (4:08)
 "Drop in the Basket" (Grigoroff) – (2:59)
 "Heywire" (Adducci/Grigoroff/Tuma) – (2:33)
 "The Torch Singer" (Prine) – (7:08)
 "True Swamp" (Adducci/Barnard/Grigoroff/Tuma) – (3:19)
 "Marleyphine Hank" (Adducci/Grigoroff) – (2:33)
 "You and You Alone" (Adducci) – (4:41)
 "Cupa Cowfee" (Fahey) – (2:14)
 "Over the Hill" (Grigoroff) – (4:57)
 "Zillion" (Adducci) – (4:55)
 "Why Are You" (Adducci/Grigoroff) – (3:37)

Personnel
 Joe Adducci – bass, vocals
 Jamey Barnard – drums
 Chris Grigoroff – guitar, vocals
 Scott Tuma – guitar

References

 Harp Magazine: "How Souled American's Flubber Changed My Life", by John Darnielle, September, 2006.
 Chicago Sun-Times: "Album feels good to Souled American", by Don McLeese, May 26, 1989.

1989 albums
Souled American albums
Rough Trade Records albums